Taipei City Arts Promotion Office is a cultural center in Songshan District, Taipei, Taiwan.

History

The founding preparation and planning stage of the cultural center began in April 1961. It was opened in January 1964 under the Department of Education of the Taipei City Government as the Taipei Municipal Social Education Hall (臺北市立社會教育館) at Chung-Shan Building in Taipei. In January 1967, the center borrowed the Ming-Lun Hall of Taipei Confucius Temple as their temporary location. In 1976, the center decided to construct its own place at the Municipal Park No. 5. The construction work commenced in March 1979 and was completed in June 1983. The center was officially reopened to the public on 22 October in the same year. In November 1999, the center was taken over by the Department of Cultural Affairs and its English name was changed to Taipei Cultural Center. In November 2015, the center was changed to Taipei City Arts Promotion Office.

Notable events
 22nd Golden Bell Awards
 23rd Golden Horse Awards
 24th Golden Horse Awards

Transportation
The cultural center is accessible within walking distance South East from Taipei Arena Station of Taipei Metro.

See also
 List of tourist attractions in Taiwan

References

External links

 

1964 establishments in Taiwan
Art centers in Taipei
Arts organizations established in 1964